2002 Belarusian First League was the twelfth season of 2nd level football championship in Belarus. It started in April and ended in October 2002.

Team changes from 2001 season
Two top teams of last season (Torpedo Zhodino and Zvezda-VA-BGU Minsk) were promoted to Belarusian Premier League. They were replaced by two teams that finished at the bottom of 2001 Belarusian Premier League table (Naftan Novopolotsk and Vedrich-97 Rechitsa).

One team that finished at the bottom of 2001 season table (Rogachev-DUSSh-1) relegated to the Second League. They were replaced by two best teams of 2001 Second League (Lokomotiv Minsk and Smorgon), and the league was expended from 15 to 16 teams.

Orsha, who finished 12th last season, withdrew to the amateur level in winter. To replace them, Rogachev-DUSSh-1 were spared from relegation.

Before the start of the season, Svisloch Osipovichi changed their name to Osipovichi, Keramik Bereza to FC Bereza and Rogachev-DUSSh-1 to Dnepr-DUSSh-1 Rogachev.

Teams and locations

League table

Top goalscorers

See also
2002 Belarusian Premier League
2001–02 Belarusian Cup
2002–03 Belarusian Cup

External links
RSSSF

Belarusian First League seasons
2
Belarus
Belarus